Michel Particelli d'Émery, (6 June 1596 in Lyon – 25 May 1650 in Paris), was the son of a banker in Lyon, France, originally from an Italian family of Lucca, Italy, who was the counsellor of Cardinal-Duc de Richelieu. A portrait of him was changed by Théophile-Abraham Hamel in order to give a face to Samuel de Champlain.

Champlain's new face
According to Archive's Canada site, Michel Particelli d'Émery's face was used to represent Champlain for more than a century, and is still used by many historians to represent Champlain.

References

1596 births
1650 deaths
French Ministers of Finance